The Underwood Wind Farm (Enbridge Ontario Wind Farm) is a wind farm located in Bruce County, Ontario, near the shores of Lake Huron.  It was developed by Enbridge Inc., a Canadian corporation better known for involvement in fossil fuels and their distribution.

The farm consists of 110 Vestas V82 wind turbines, each rated at 1.65MW, for a total nameplate capacity of 181.5MW.  The project includes a substation to step up the power generated by the turbines to 230kV for transmission.

The Enbridge Ontario Wind Farm is not the only energy development in the area; Bruce County also boasts the Huron Wind wind farm, and the Bruce Nuclear Generating Station.

See also

List of wind farms in Canada
List of offshore wind farms

References

External links
Enbridge Wind Energy
Ontario Power Authority

Wind farms in Ontario
Enbridge
Buildings and structures in Bruce County